Jawahar Navodaya Vidyalaya, West Sikkim or locally known as JNV Rothak is a boarding, co-educational  school in West Sikkim district of Sikkim state in India. Navodaya Vidyalayas are funded by the Indian Ministry of Human Resources Development and administered  by Navodaya Vidyalaya Smiti, an autonomous body under the ministry. Navodaya Vidyalayas offer free education to talented children from Class VI to XII.

History 
The school was established in 1987, and is a part of Jawahar Navodaya Vidyalaya schools. This school is administered and monitored by Shillong regional office of Navodaya Vidyalaya Smiti.

Admission 
Admission to JNV Rothak at class VI level is made through nationwide selection test conducted by Navodaya Vidyalaya Smiti. The information about test is disseminated and advertised in district by the office of West Sikkim district magistrate (Collector), who is also chairperson of Vidyalya Management Committee.

Affiliations 
JNV West Sikkim is affiliated to Central Board of Secondary Education with affiliation number 1840001.

See also 
 Jawahar Navodaya Vidyalaya, East Sikkim
 Jawahar Navodaya Vidyalaya, North Sikkim
 Jawahar Navodaya Vidyalaya, South Sikkim
 List of Jawahar Navodaya Vidyalaya schools

References

External links 

 Official Website of JNV West Sikkim

High schools and secondary schools in Sikkim
West Sikkim
Educational institutions established in 1987
1987 establishments in Sikkim